An A-law algorithm is a standard companding algorithm, used in European 8-bit PCM digital communications systems to optimize, i.e. modify, the dynamic range of an analog signal for digitizing. It is one of two versions of the G.711 standard from ITU-T, the other version being the similar μ-law, used in North America and Japan.

For a given input , the equation for A-law encoding is as follows:

where  is the compression parameter. In Europe, .

A-law expansion is given by the inverse function:

The reason for this encoding is that the wide dynamic range of speech does not lend itself well to efficient linear digital encoding. A-law encoding effectively reduces the dynamic range of the signal, thereby increasing the coding efficiency and resulting in a signal-to-distortion ratio that is superior to that obtained by linear encoding for a given number of bits.

Comparison to μ-law 
The μ-law algorithm provides a slightly larger dynamic range than the A-law at the cost of worse proportional distortion for small signals. By convention, A-law is used for an international connection if at least one country uses it.

See also 
 μ-law algorithm
 Audio level compression
 Signal compression
 Companding
 G.711
 DS0
 Tapered floating point

External links 
 Waveform Coding Techniques - Has details of implementation (but note that the A-law equation is incorrect)
 A-law implementation in C-language with example code

Audio codecs